This article is about the demographic features of the population of Mayotte, including population density, ethnicity, education level, health of the populace, economic status, religious affiliations and other aspects of the population. Mayotte's population density went from 179 persons per square kilometer in 1985 to 251 per square kilometer in 1991. Its capital, Dzaoudzi had a population of 5,865 according to the 1985 census; the island's largest town, Mamoudzou, had 12,026 people.

Births and deaths

Population by Sex and Age Group (Census 05.IX.2017):

CIA World Factbook demographic statistics
The following demographic statistics are from the CIA World Factbook, unless otherwise indicated.

Population:
178,437 (July 2003 est.)

Age structure:
0-14 years:
46.5% (male 41,632; female 41,301)
15-64 years:
51.8% (male 50,373; female 42,118)
65 years and over:
1.7% (male 1,502; female 1,511) (2003 est.)

Median age:
total:
16.9 years
male:
18.1 years
female:
15.7 years (2002)

Population growth rate:
3.47% (2008 est.)

Birth rate:
42.86 births/1,000 population (2003 est.)

Death rate:
8.34 deaths/1,000 population (2003 est.)

Net migration rate:
7.94 migrant(s)/1,000 population (2003 est.)

Sex ratio:
at birth:
1.03 male(s)/female
under 15 years:
1.01 male(s)/female
15-64 years:
1.2 male(s)/female
65 years and over:
0.99 male(s)/female
total population:
1.1 male(s)/female (2003 est.)

Infant mortality rate:
total:
65.98 deaths/1,000 live births (2003 est.)
female:
59.44 deaths/1,000 live births
male:
72.32 deaths/1,000 live births

Life expectancy at birth:
total population:
60.6 years
male:
58.49 years
female:
62.78 years (2003 est.)

HIV/AIDS - adult prevalence rate:
NA%

HIV/AIDS - people living with HIV/AIDS:
NA

HIV/AIDS - deaths:
NA

Total fertility rate:
4.5 children born/woman (2008 est.)

Nationality:
noun:
Mahorais (singular and plural)
adjective:
Mahoran

Ethnic groups:
NA

Religions:
Muslim 97%, Christian (mostly Roman Catholic)

Languages: Mahorian (a Swahili dialect), French (official language) spoken by 35% of the population

Literacy:
definition:
NA
total population: 86%
(Encyclopædia Britannica)
male:
NA%
female:
NA%

Hospital

The centre hospitalier de Mayotte is a French hospital located in Mamoudzou, on the ground of Grande-Terre island in Mayotte, in south west of océan Indien. Its technical plate has seen in year 2008,  out of  born people seen within the collectivité territoriale. This give it the little nickname of  « first maternité of France ». During the year 2007, 62% of women who came there to have a baby were not affiliated to the Sécurité sociale : among them, there are many Anjouan women and other Malgaches women enter illicitly in the French territory.

See also 

 Santé à Mayotte

References 

Geography of Mayotte
Mahoran culture